Claudia Klein  (born 24 September 1971) is a German women's international footballer who plays as a defender. She is a member of the Germany women's national football team. She was part of the team at the 1995 FIFA Women's World Cup. On club level she plays for Grün-Weiß Brauweiler in Germany.

References

1971 births
Living people
German women's footballers
Germany women's international footballers
Place of birth missing (living people)
1995 FIFA Women's World Cup players
Women's association football defenders
UEFA Women's Championship-winning players